Book of Roads and Kingdoms (or …Highways and Kingdoms/Routes and Kingdoms/Routes and Countries/Routes and Realms; , Kitāb al-Masālik wa'l-Mamālik) is the name given to several medieval Arabic language texts dealing with geography:
 — genre of medieval Arabic geographical literature.
Book of Roads and Kingdoms, written in the 9th century by Ibn Khordadbeh.
, written in the early 10th century by Istakhri.
Book of Roads and Kingdoms, written in the mid 11th century by al-Bakri in Spain.
, written in the 10th century by Ibn Hawqal.
Book of Roads and Kingdoms, written in the 10th century by Muhammad ibn Yūsuf al-Warrāq.
Book of Roads and Kingdoms, written in the 9th century by Ahmad ibn al-Harith al-Kharraz (al-Khazzaz).
Book of Roads and Kingdoms, written in the 10th century by Abu Abdallah Jayhani.